The 2011–12 NZF Cup, also known as the 2011–12 White Ribbon Cup, was the inaugural tournament involving ASB Premiership clubs not involved in Champions League football. This was the first and only year it was held, mainly for the purpose of giving ASB Premiership clubs much needed football involvement during gap weeks that the OFC Champion League was being played.

Participants
Auckland and Waitakere both topped the 2010-11 ASB Premiership, earning them a place in the 2011-12 OFC Champions League. The six remaining ASB Premiership teams were then entered into the White Ribbon Cup where they were split into two conferences relating to their geographic location with Waikato, Hawke's Bay and Manawatu forming the Northern Conference and Wellington, Canterbury and Otago forming the Southern Conference.

Schedule

Group stage
Within each conference, each team plays the other two teams once. The top team from each conference then play each other in the grand final to determine the winner of the White Ribbon cup.

Northern Conference

Southern Conference

Final

Top goalscorers

References

NZL